AAP TV (Azad Kashmir, Abaseen & Pothohar Television) is UK's first Pothwari/Pahari television channel for the British Pothwari & Pahari community. AAP TV was formerly named Aapna Channel which shut down in March and then re-opened as AAP TV. AAP is based in Bradford, West Yorkshire & owned by Sharda International Ltd. The test transmission of the station occurred in July 2008, and the channel went live in August. It can be found on SKY 803.

Another television channel named KBC (Kashmiri Broadcasting Corporation) has also gone live on Sunday 24 August.

The KBC channels are being launched by the Afsar Group from Birmingham. Whilst KBC will be added to the Sky EPG next week, live programming on the channels don't begin until Sunday 24 August
Kashmir Broadcasting Corporation  trading as KBC – a UK-based multilingual, independent and global satellite television channel broadcasting for South Asians across UK, Europe, Africa, Middle East and Asia in general and Jammu Kashmir in particular. 
The channel was set up by a British Kashmiri entrepreneur ’ – the first ever independent Kashmiri TV channel the voice of kashmiri people.www.kbcchannel.tv

References

British Pakistani mass media
Mass media in Bradford